The NORCECA qualification for the 2010 FIVB Volleyball Men's World Championship saw member nations compete for five places at the finals in Italy.

Draw
33 of the 35 NORCECA national teams entered qualification. The teams were distributed according to their position in the FIVB Senior Men's Rankings as of 5 January 2008 using the serpentine system for their distribution. (Rankings shown in brackets) Teams ranked 1–6 did not compete in the first and second rounds, and automatically qualified for the third round.

First round

Second round

Third round

Playoff round

First round

Pool A
Venue:  Beausejour Indoor Stadium, Gros Islet, Saint Lucia
Dates: April 15–19, 2009
All times are Atlantic Standard Time (UTC−04:00)

|}

|}

Pool B
Venue:  YMCA Sports Complex, St. John's, Antigua and Barbuda
Dates: April 1–5, 2009
All times are Atlantic Standard Time (UTC−04:00)

|}

|}

Second round

Pool C
Venue:  UWI Sport & Physical Education Centre, Port of Spain, Trinidad and Tobago
Dates: June 2–6, 2009
All times are Atlantic Standard Time (UTC−04:00)

Preliminary round

Group A

|}

|}

Group B

|}

|}

Final round

Semifinals

|}

5th place

|}

3rd place

|}

Final

|}

Final standing

Pool D
Venue:  National Arena, Kingston, Jamaica
Dates: May 20–24, 2009
All times are Eastern Standard Time (UTC−05:00)

Preliminary round

Group A

|}

|}

Group B

|}

|}

Final round

Semifinals

|}

5th place

|}

3rd place

|}

Final

|}

Final standing

Pool E
Venue:  Gimnasio del Polideportivo España, Managua, Nicaragua
Dates: November 29–December 5, 2008
All times are Central Standard Time (UTC−06:00)

|}

|}

Third round

Pool F
Venue:  Bren Events Center, Irvine, United States
Dates: August 15–17, 2009
All times are Pacific Daylight Time (UTC−07:00)

|}

|}

Pool G
Venue:  Coliseo Héctor Solá Bezares, Caguas, Puerto Rico
Dates: July 8–10, 2009
All times are Atlantic Standard Time (UTC−04:00)

|}

|}

Pool H
Venue:  Coliseo de la Ciudad Deportiva, Havana, Cuba
Dates: August 14–16, 2009
All times are Cuba Daylight Time (UTC−04:00)

|}

|}

Third placed teams

|}

Playoff round

Pool I
Venue:  Complejo Panamericano de Voleibol, Guadalajara, Mexico
Dates: August 28–30, 2009
All times are Central Daylight Time (UTC−05:00)

|}

|}

References

External links
 2010 World Championship Qualification

2010 FIVB Volleyball Men's World Championship
2008 in volleyball
2009 in volleyball
FIVB Volleyball World Championship qualification